Ülo Vilimaa (13 March 1941 – 27 September 2021) was an Estonian dancer, choreographer, theatre director, and painter.

From 1962 until 1974, he was ballet soloist and ballet master in Vanemuine theatre, and from 1974 until 1997, principal ballet master. From 1997 until 2002, he was a director at the Vanemuine theatre.

In addition Vilimaa was also a painter. His personal exhibitions have been shown in Estonia and abroad.

Awards:
 1970 Merited artist of Estonian SSR 
 2001 Order of the White Star, III class.

References

1941 births
2021 deaths
Estonian male ballet dancers
Estonian choreographers
20th-century Estonian painters
20th-century Estonian male artists
21st-century Estonian painters
Recipients of the Order of the White Star, 3rd Class
Estonian theatre directors
Artists from Tallinn
People from Tallinn